The White Ernz is a river flowing through Luxembourg, joining the Sauer at Reisdorf.  It flows through the towns of Larochette, Medernach and Ermsdorf. The river valley also includes the notable feature of having a twin castle from the 14th century named Larochette Castle.

References

Rivers of the Ardennes (Luxembourg)
Rivers of Luxembourg